The Skagway River is a river in British Columbia, Canada and the state of Alaska, United States, flowing southwest across the international boundary at  just southeast of the White Pass.  Flowing slightly northwest after crossing the boundary, it turns south-southwest to meet the sea at the head of Taiya Inlet. There is a vehicle bridge over the river at the north end of Skagway as well as two pedestrian bridges, one next to the vehicle bridge and one at the mouth of the river near the airport. The river is not navigable by raft or canoe or kayak because of the supports under the vehicle bridge and the shallow swift flowing water. In addition, there is a great quantity of scrap metal debris which has been dumped into the river over the past century.  When some people have tried to raft the mile to the ocean, their rafts have been destroyed under the bridge by the accumulation of tree branches and vegetation that is choked there.

Heading north (upstream) from its mouth, the major branches of the Skagway River are as follows: 1–East Fork: The East Fork branches off the Skagway River, opposite Mile Post 4.8 of the White Pass railroad.  At Mile Post 5.8, the railroad makes a U-turn, crosses the East Fork, and loops back to follow the main river.  2–White Pass Fork: The Skagway River turns to the east and White Pass Fork branches off to the north, opposite Mile Post 12 of the railroad.  At Mile Post 14.2, the railroad makes a U-turn, crosses the Skagway River, and loops back to follow White Pass Fork.  3–Cut-off Gulch: White Pass Fork splits into Cut-off Gulch to the east and Dead Horse Gulch to the north, opposite Mile Post 18 of the railroad.  At Mile Post 18.6, the railroad makes a left turn and crosses Cut-off Gulch.  4–Dead Horse Gulch: After crossing Cut-off Gulch, the railroad goes through a tunnel which comes out along Dead Horse Gulch.  The head of Dead Horse Gulch is at Pump House Lake, at Mile Post 20 of the railroad.

References

External links

Atlin District
Cassiar Land District
International rivers of North America
Rivers of the Municipality of Skagway Borough, Alaska
Rivers of the Boundary Ranges
Rivers of Alaska
Rivers of British Columbia